Emanoil Bucuța (born Emanoil Popescu; June 27, 1887 – October 7, 1946) was a Romanian prose writer and poet.

Born in Bolintin-Deal, Giurgiu County, his parents were Ioniță Popescu, a butler, and his wife Rebeca-Elena (née Bucuța). Moving to Bucharest, he graduated from Saint Sava High School in 1907, followed by a degree in Germanistics from the University of Bucharest in 1911. He made his prose publishing debut in 1903, in Universul ilustrat. He worked on a doctorate at the University of Berlin in 1912 and 1913, but quit due to lack of funds. While there, he kept an intimate diary called Mozaic. After 1918, he became an active promoter of cultural life in interwar Romania. He was a director at the Labor Ministry in 1922, at the Cultural Foundation in 1925 and at the Schools Department from 1931 to 1944. He served as general secretary at the Religious Affairs and Arts Ministry from 1932 to 1933, and was editor-in-chief of two magazines, Graiul românesc (1927-1929) and Boabe de grâu (1930-1935). Reviews that published his work include Drum drept, Ideea Europeană, Gândirea, Ramuri and Viața Românească. He took part in Balkan conferences between 1930 and 1932 (these would later result in the Balkan Pact) and was a delegate to PEN congresses from 1927 to 1933. He was elected a corresponding member of the Romanian Academy in 1941. As he sadly remarked, "the writer was pushed aside by the cultural figure".

His first published volume was a 1920 book of poems, Florile inimii; George Călinescu observed: "he is the first intimist in the proper sense of the word, a poet who sings of his small domestic universe". His novels were Fuga lui Șefki (1927; Romanian Writers' Society prize, 1928), Maica Domnului de la mare (1930) and Capra neagră (1938). In two volumes, Crescătorul de șoimi (1928) and Pietre de vad (I-IV, 1937-1944), he collected essays and articles about the land and people of Romania and other countries, the art of literature and painting, and culture and society. He left behind a massive diary in manuscript form.

Notes

1887 births
1946 deaths
People from Giurgiu County
Saint Sava National College alumni
University of Bucharest alumni
Humboldt University of Berlin alumni
Romanian diarists
Romanian essayists
Romanian magazine editors
Romanian civil servants
20th-century Romanian poets
20th-century Romanian novelists
20th-century essayists
Corresponding members of the Romanian Academy